Genuine, (28 April 1992 – January 19, 2015) is a Japanese Thoroughbred racehorse and sire. From the first crop of foals sired by Sunday Silence he won five of his twenty-one races and finished second seven times in a racing career which lasted from October 1994 until November 1997. After winning once as a juvenile in 1994 he improved to become one of the best colts of his generation in Japan in the following year, winning the Satsuki Sho and finishing second in the Tokyo Yushun. He remained in training for two more seasons, recording his best subsequent victory in the 1996 Mile Championship. Apart from his wins he was placed in the Yasuda Kinen and two runnings of the Tenno Sho. After his retirement from racing he had some success as breeding stallion in Japan and Australia.

Background
Genuine was a brown horse with a white snip bred in Japan by Shadai Farm. He was from the first crop of foals sired by Sunday Silence, who won the 1989 Kentucky Derby, before retiring to stud in Japan where he was champion sire on thirteen consecutive occasions. His other major winners included Deep Impact, Stay Gold, Heart's Cry, Manhattan Cafe, Zenno Rob Roy and Neo Universe. Genuine's dam Croupier Lady was a successful racemare in the United States, winning thirteen races between 1985 and 1989 before being exported to Japan. In addition to Genuine, she produced Croupier Star the dam of Asakusa Kings the Best Japanese Three-Year-Old Colt of 2007.

During his racing career Genuine was owned by Shadai Race Horse Co Ltd and trained by Yasuhisa Matsuyama.

Racing career

1994: two-year-old season
Genuine began his racing career by finishing second in a maiden race over 1400 metres at Tokyo Racecourse on 15 October and then won a similar event over the same course and distance fifteen days later. On his final appearance of the season he finished second to Kokuto Julian in the Akamatsu Sho over 1600 metres at Tokyo on 27 November.

1995: three-year-old season
Genuine began his second season by winning the Saintpaulia Sho over 1800 metres at Tokyo in January and then defeated Meiner Bridge over 2000 metres on heavy ground in the Wakaba Stakes at Nakayama Racecourse on 18 March. The colt was then moved up in class for the Grade I Satsuki Sho over 2000 metres at Nakayama on 16 April. Ridden by Yukio Okabe, he won from Tayasu Tsuyoshi and Automatic. On 28 May he was one of eighteen colts to contest the Tokyo Yushun over 2400 metres and finished second, beaten one and a half lengths by Tayasu Tsuyoshi.

He returned after a summer break and finished second to the five-year-old in a Grade III handicap race in September but then finished only sixth to Sugano Oji in the Grade II Mainichi Okan on 8 October. He then contested the autumn edition of the Tenno Sho over 2000 metres at Tokyo and finished second of the seventeen runners behind Sakura Chitose O. On his final appearance of the season he was invited to contest the 2500 metre Arima Kinen at Nakayama but made little impact and finished tenth behind Mayano Top Gun.

1996: four-year-old season
Genuine made only two appearances in the first half of 1996. He finished second to Sakura Laurel in the Nakayama Kinen and fourth behind Trot Thunder, Taiki Blizzard and Hishi Akebono in the Yasuda Kinen. In October he finished unplaced behind Bubble Gum Fellow in the Tenno Sho and was then dropped back in distance for the Grade I Mile Championship at Kyoto Racecourse on 17 November. Ridden by Okabe, he recorded his second victory at the highest level as he won by half a length and a neck from the five-year-old mare Syourinomegami and Eishin Washington. As in 1997, he ended his year by finishing unplaced in the Arima Kinen.

1997: five-year-old season
Genuine began his fourth season in the Yasuda Kinen and improved on his 1996 effort as he finished second of the eighteen runners behind Taiki Blizzard. He then finished fourth in a Grade II race at Sapporo Racecourse and fifth behind Bubble Gum Fellow in the Mainichi Okan. On October 26 he again contested the Tenno Sho and finished third behind Air Groove and Bubble Gum Fellow. On his final racecourse he attempted to repeat his 1996 success in the Mile Championship but finished unplaced behind Taiki Shuttle.

Stud record
Genuine was retired from racing to become a breeding stallion for Shadai Farm in Japan, and was also shuttled to stand in Australia. He was retired from stud duty in 2009 and died on 19 January 2015 at the age of twenty-three. The best of his offspring was the Australian-bred Pompeii Ruler, whose wins included the Australian Cup and the Queen Elizabeth Stakes (ATC). His Japanese runners included the Graded stakes winners Don Cool and Maple Road.

Pedigree

References 

1992 racehorse births
2015 racehorse deaths
Racehorses bred in Japan
Racehorses trained in Japan
Thoroughbred family 4-g